Bearwallow is an unincorporated community in Buchanan County, Virginia, United States. A short distance to the east of Bearwallow lies the intersection of Buchanan County with Tazewell County, Virginia and McDowell County, West Virginia.

A post office was established as Bear Wallow in 1874 and remained in operation until it was discontinued in 1951. The community is named after the use of the area by bears to wallow.

References

Unincorporated communities in Virginia
Unincorporated communities in Buchanan County, Virginia